Carmen Borgia is a singer, songwriter, sound mixer and film sound designer residing in New York City. He was born February 3, 1959 in Jacksonville, Florida.

Music 
His music tends toward songs or soundtracks. Recent recordings are "North" and "The Red Circle Line", released by Arctos Records.  In 2009 a theatrical musical, "South", was commissioned by Dixon Place in New York City.

Recent film scores include "The Bentfootes", directed by Kriota Willberg and "Louise Bourgeois: The Spider, the Mistress, and the Tangerine". Past music projects include the bands "Orson Welk", "Some Ambulants" and "The Secret Sons Of The Pope".  He has composed music for numerous theatrical productions at The Western Stage in Salinas, California, including the 1989 production of "East of Eden".

Film mixing and sound design 
In 1999 he was employed as a film sound designer and mixer at DuArt Film and Video in New York.  In 2001 he became the Head of Audio Services there and in 2009 was named Vice President of Audio Production.  He currently supervises audio production for the North American English Language dubbing of Pokémon.  In 2005 he mixed U-Carmen eKhayelitsha, which won the Golden Bear award at the Berlin International Film Festival.

Writing 
He is a contributing editor to The Digital Filmmaker Web site where he has written articles relating to the craft of film sound.

Ukulele 
Carmen began a small get together of ukulele players at a local bookstore in June 2015. He has been leading ukulele groups since then and is one of the hubs of the growing ukulele movement in the Hudson Valley.  During the pandemic he, with his friend, John Sturman, began bi-weekly Zoom meets with players from across the world. He, and Sturman, host a monthly ukulele radio show on WGXC FM.

Albums 
 This Is Orson Welk (1986)
 North (2003)
 The Red Circle Line (2009)

References

External links
Carmen Borgia's Home Page
DuArt Film & Video credits
Carmen Borgia's Blog

1959 births
Living people
Musicians from Jacksonville, Florida
Writers from Jacksonville, Florida
Singer-songwriters from Florida